Below is a full list of primary-level subdivisions of local government in the Philippines. As of June 30, 2019, there are 81 provinces, 33 highly urbanized cities, 5 independent component cities, and one independent municipality. All 120 primary-level LGUs (local government units) are under general administrative supervision of the President of the Philippines.

See also
 List of cities in the Philippines
 List of cities and municipalities in the Philippines
 List of provinces of the Philippines

References

Local government in the Philippines
Local government
Government